This article lists the results for the China women's national football team between 1990 and 1999.

1990

1991

1993

1994

1995

1996

1997

1998

1999

References

1990–1999
1990s in China
1990 in Chinese football
1991 in Chinese football
1992 in Chinese football
1993 in Chinese football
1994 in Chinese football
1995 in Chinese football
1996 in Chinese football
1997 in Chinese football
1998 in Chinese football
1999 in Chinese football